Latebraria is a genus of moths in the family Erebidae. The genus was erected by Achille Guenée in 1852. The moths are found in southern North and Central America.

Species
 Latebraria amphipyroides Guenée, 1852
 Latebraria errans Walker, 1858
 Latebraria janthinula Guenée, 1852

References

Latebraria

Thermesiini
Moth genera